Union Sportive des Forces Armées et Sécurité de Bamako, better known as USFAS Bamako is a Malian basketball club based in Bamako. Established in 1965, the team plays in the Ligue 1.

Honours
Ligue 1
Champions (1): 2017–18

Notable players
Mamadou Keita

References

Basketball teams in Mali